Wingfield High School is a public high school located in Jackson, Mississippi, United States. It is part of the Jackson Public School District. Almost 900 children from southern Jackson attend Wingfield High School in grades 912, as well as over 70 administration and staff. The principal of is Roderick Smith.

The mascot of Wingfield is the falcon.

Demographics
There are a total of 859 students enrolled in Wingfield High during the 20112012 school year. The gender makeup of the district was 49% female and 51% male. The racial makeup of the school was 97.35% African American and 2.65% White.

1982 shooting incident
On November 12, 1982, an 18-year-old dropout James Hartzog armed with a 20-gauge shotgun killed his girlfriend, 17-year-old Faye Williams, in her algebra class at Wingfield High School. Hartzog then killed himself.

Feeder pattern
The following schools feed into Wingfield High School.

Middle Schools
Peeples Middle School
Whitten Middle School
Elementary Schools
Key Elementary School
Lester Elementary School
Marshall Elementary School
Sykes Elementary School
Wilkins Elementary School

References

External links

Public high schools in Mississippi
Schools in Jackson, Mississippi